The 2004 European Parliament election was held between 10 and 13 June 2004 in the 25 member states of the European Union, using varying election days according to local custom. The European Parliamental parties could not be voted for, but elected national parties aggregated in European Parliamental parties after the elections.

Votes were counted as the polls closed, but results were not announced until 13 and 14 June so results from one country would not influence voters in another where polls were still open; however, the Netherlands, voting on Thursday 10, announced nearly complete provisional results as soon as they were counted, on the evening of its election day, a move heavily criticized by the European Commission.

342 million people were eligible to vote, the second-largest democratic electorate in the world after India. It was the biggest transnational direct election in history, and the 10 new member states elected MEPs for the first time. The new (6th) Parliament consisted of 732 Members of the European Parliament (MEPs).

Results showed a general defeat of governing parties and an increase in representatives from eurosceptic parties. No majority was achieved. The balance of power in the Parliament remained the same (largest party EPP-ED, second largest PES) despite the 10 new member states.

Final results

Statistics

Results by country 
The national results as at 21 July 2004 are as follows:

Results by EU party (2004 estimated result)

The estimated votes by EU party are as follows:

Registered voters: 353,460,958  (est.)
Votes cast: 154,317,718 (43.66%) (est.)
Total seats: 732

Results by EU party (2007 national result)

The notional results by EU party as at 8 January 2007 are as follows:

Registered voters: 378,106,633  (est.)
Votes cast: 168,317,718 (44.49%) (est.)
Total seats: 785 (+53)

New parties in the 2004 election

 In the United Kingdom, RESPECT The Unity Coalition was established to fight this election with the intention to use it as a springboard for a campaign against Tony Blair's government. The English Democrats Party appeared in England for the first time in 5 of the 9 English Constituencies, campaigning for an English Parliament and against English 'European' regions.
 A European Union-wide political party, the European Greens, was established in Rome on 21 February 2004 to contest this election.
 Swedish Junilistan (the June list) formed early in the year, meant to provide social democratic and right wing voters an EU sceptic alternative.
 In the Netherlands Europa Transparant of Paul van Buitenen got two seats.
 In Austria the Liste Hans-Peter Martin obtained two seats.

New inclusion

Gibraltar participated as a result of the judgement in Matthews v. United Kingdom

Political group reshuffle after the 2004 election 

 Liberals: The European Liberal Democrat and Reform Party created a new grouping by allying with MEPs from the French party Union for French Democracy (previously part of the EPP-ED), the Margherita Party (Italy) (previously part of the EPP-ED), other Italian members, the Lithuanian Labour Party and the Belgian MR-MCC (previously EPP-ED). The new allies formed the EDP and a new combined group, between the ELDR and the EDP, was formed with the name ALDE: the Alliance of Liberals and Democrats for Europe.
 Eurosceptics: Sweden's Junilistan, the anti-abortion League of Polish Families, and the French Combats Souverainistes joined the existing Europe of Democracies and Diversities group, which already included the UK Independence Party (UKIP). The group renamed itself Independence and Democracy (ID).

Other elections
The elections coincided with legislative elections in Luxembourg and presidential elections in Lithuania. They also coincided with local and regional elections in England and Wales, Irish local elections, regional elections in Belgium, local or regional elections in most of Italy, and state parliament elections in the German state of Thuringia.

See also
List of Members of the European Parliament 2004-2009

References

External links 
 European Union's site for the European Parliament election, covering all of the European Union
 National Information offices and national election web sites
 European Election News by European Election Law Association (Eurela)
 Election days in the 25 countries
 Czech Republic and the European Parliament elections 2004
 Evaluation of the European Parliament Elections (2004)

Results 
BBC News: EU-wide results
Guardian: results in the United Kingdom
Irish results from RTE
Polish official results
Full Danish official results
Predicting the Future: the next European Parliament (pre-election prediction)

European Election information sites 
 Ireland: European Parliament Office in Ireland election information
 Information from the Finnish Justice Ministry on the election
 attendance and voting records; software patents (see article software patent) and environmental issues (see articles green/environmental issues) collect data on how MEPs voted, in order that the electorate may have a better idea on how to vote on them.
 European Election Studies www.europeanelectionstudies.net

Candidates 
 Belgium
 France
 Netherlands
 Sweden
 UK
 See German version of this article for the German and Austrian candidates